The Shaw Classic is a strongman competition run and hosted by four-time World's Strongest Man Brian Shaw, who won the inaugural competition in 2020. The second edition of the contest had 16 athletes with backgrounds from Europe and North America. The total prize pool in 2020 was $53,900. In 2021 the prize pool increased to $100,000 and in 2022 the prize pool increased to $150,000.

Results

Competitors

2022

 1st Trey Mitchell lll
 2nd Brian Shaw
 3rd Mitchell Hooper
 4th Oleksii Novikov 
 5th Maxime Boudreault
 6th Kevin Faires
 7th Aivars Smaukstelis 
 8th Evan Singleton 
 9th Konstantine Janashia

 10th Zydrunas Savickas

 11th Bobby Thompson

 12th Gabriel Pena
 13th Gabriel Rheaume
 14th Jerry Pritchett

 15th Luke Stoltman

2021 

 1st Trey Mitchell lll
2nd Brian Shaw
3rd JF Caron
4th Kevin Faires
5th Evan Singleton 
6th Bobby Thompson
7th Adam Bishop
8th Maxime Boudreault
9th Aivars Smaukstelis 
10th Konstantine Janashia
11th Graham Hicks
12th Zydrunas Savickas
13th Gabriel Rheaume
14th Gabriel Pena
15th Jerry Pritchett
16th Mikhail Shivlyakov

2020
 1st Brian Shaw
 2nd JF Caron
 3rd Oleksii Novikov 
 4th Trey Mitchell lll
 5th Jerry Pritchett
 6th Adam Bishop
 7th Luke Stoltman
 8th Maxime Boudreault
 9th Kevin Faires
 10th Terry Hollands

References

Strongmen competitions
2020 establishments in the United States
Recurring sporting events established in 2020